Kilwinning is an unincorporated community in Scotland County, in the U.S. state of Missouri.

History
Kilwinning was originally called Uniontown, and under the latter name was platted in 1857.  A post office called Kilwinning was established in 1880, and remained in operation until 1907. The community's name is a transfer from Kilwinning, in Scotland.

References

Unincorporated communities in Scotland County, Missouri
1857 establishments in Missouri
Unincorporated communities in Missouri